José Martín López Cisneros (born 11 November 1972) is a Mexican politician affiliated with the PAN. He currently serves as Deputy of the LXII Legislature of the Mexican Congress representing Nuevo León. He also served as Deputy during the LX Legislature.

References

1972 births
Living people
Politicians from Monterrey
National Action Party (Mexico) politicians
21st-century Mexican politicians
Deputies of the LXII Legislature of Mexico
Members of the Chamber of Deputies (Mexico) for Nuevo León